Harvey Miguel Robinson (born December 6, 1974) is an American serial killer currently imprisoned on death row in Pennsylvania. He was 18 when he committed his violent spree, killing three and injuring two.

Background
Robinson's father was an alcoholic who physically and emotionally abused Robinson's mother and she eventually left the family. His father was later incarcerated for beating his mistress to death.

Crimes 
Robinson's rape and murder victims were:

Joan Burghardt, a 29-year-old nurse's aide (August 1992).
Charlotte Schmoyer, a 15-year-old newspaper carrier for The Morning Call (June 1993). Schmoyer was a student at Dieruff High School in Allentown.
Jessica Jean Fortney, a 47-year-old grandmother (July 1993).

Between the murders of Burghardt and Schmoyer, Robinson was arrested for burglary and served eight months in prison. After the murder of Schmoyer, he was almost apprehended when he was pulled over for a speeding violation. But Robinson received his speeding ticket and left.

Capture
Denise Sam-Cali was one of two of Robinson's victims who survived. The other was a five-year-old girl Robinson stalked for days; Robinson broke into her home, raped and choked her, and left her for dead, but she survived. Sam-Cali managed to break free of Robinson's grip and run outside. Robinson attempted to attack her again but she fled. Eventually, the police used Sam-Cali as bait to lure Robinson in order to capture him. A shootout erupted between Robinson and a police officer, Brian Lewis. Robinson fled, but he was wounded. He went to the hospital, where he was arrested.

Aftermath
Robinson was sentenced to death for his crimes. As of April 2006, Robinson's execution had been stayed. He was later resentenced to life imprisonment for the murder of Joan Burghardt because he was 17 when the crime was committed. On December 14, 2012, Robinson agreed to waive his appeal rights in the Schmoyer case in exchange for a life sentence. In December 2013, the Pennsylvania Supreme Court upheld Robinson's death penalty in the Fortney murder. In October 2019, a Pennsylvania judge urged Robinson to consider donating his brain to science, calling it 'the one gift you can give.

In the media 
The story of Robinson's crime spree was depicted in the 1996 film titled No One Could Protect Her, with Joanna Kerns playing the part of surviving victim Denise Sam-Cali.

Part of the story of Robinson's crime spree had also been told in the Investigation Discovery series Your Worst Nightmare.

He was also depicted on A&E's Killer Kids and Investigation Discovery's Most Evil and Dead of Night.

See also 
 List of serial killers in the United States

References

Further reading
Casey, Kathryn, Ladies' Home Journal, "When Children Rape," June 1995

External links
 Site about the staying of Robinson's death conviction

1974 births
1992 murders in the United States
1993 murders in the United States
20th-century American criminals
American male criminals
American murderers of children
American people convicted of murder
American people convicted of rape
American prisoners sentenced to death
American prisoners sentenced to life imprisonment
American rapists
American serial killers
Criminals from Allentown, Pennsylvania
Criminals from Montana
Minors convicted of murder
Living people
Male serial killers
People convicted of murder by Pennsylvania
Place of birth missing (living people)
Prisoners sentenced to death by Pennsylvania
Prisoners sentenced to life imprisonment by Pennsylvania
Violence against women in the United States